Synandrospadix is a monotypic genus of flowering plants in the family Araceae. The single species making up the genus is Synandrospadix vermitoxicus. It is found in Peru, Argentina, Paraguay, and Bolivia. The inflorescence has an unpleasant smell with a spathe whose inner surface is purple with brownish-green warts and a smooth green outer surface. The spadix is egg shaped, red, and has spiked male flowers protruding from it.

Uses
The Indigenous Enxet people of the Paraguayan Gran Chaco traditionally consume the roots of Synandrospadix (yátapomxet in Enxet), which are gathered in the wild.

References

 Bown, Deni (2000). Aroids: Plants of the Arum Family. Timber Press. .

Aroideae
Monotypic Araceae genera
Flora of South America